Cangumbe is a city in the Moxico Province of Angola. It has a population of 4,849.

Populated places in Angola
Moxico Province